Acequia Madre is Spanish for "mother ditch", a main acequia or irrigation canal.

Acequia Madre may refer to:
Acequia Madre (Santa Fe), New Mexico
Acequia Madre (Las Vegas, New Mexico)
Acequia Madre de Valero (San Antonio), Texas

See also
Acequia (disambiguation)